Antonio María Fabié Escudero (Sevilla, June 19th, 1832, – Madrid, December 3rd, 1899) was a politician, writer, philosopher, historian, and bibliophile, noted for his Hegelian Philosophy which he became interested in during the mid-nineteenth century while a student at the University of Sevilla. He studied pharmacy, exact science, and law.

Knights Grand Cross of the Order of Isabella the Catholic
Governors of the Bank of Spain
Members of the Royal Spanish Academy
Overseas ministers of Spain
19th-century Spanish writers
19th-century Spanish philosophers
19th-century Spanish politicians
1832 births
1899 deaths